Avraham Agmon (1928–1992) was an Israeli diplomat and economist.

He was born in Białystok, Poland. He made aliyah in 1947 and served in the 1947–1949 Palestine war with the Givati Brigade. As a student he was chairman of the national student union in 1953–1954.

In 1956 Agmon was appointed to his first diplomatic post, serving under Nativ in Moscow. Between 1958 and 1960 he worked at the Ministry of Finance in Jerusalem and later sent as First Secretary to the Israeli embassy in Russia, until 1964.

Between 1968 and 1970 he headed the Budgets Directorate and later appointed as Director General of the Ministry of Finance, serving in that position until 1975.

From 1976 to 1992 he was head of the Delek corporation.

References

1928 births
1992 deaths
20th-century Israeli economists
Israeli diplomats
20th-century Israeli Jews
Polish emigrants to Mandatory Palestine
Polish Jews in Israel
Israeli politicians